Marjorie Cohn (born November 1, 1948) is a professor of law at the Thomas Jefferson School of Law, San Diego, California, and a former president of the National Lawyers Guild.

In 1978 Cohn received a job in the International Association of Democratic Lawyers. She also "participated in delegations to Cuba, China, Russia, and Yugoslavia" early in her career.

Writings

Cohn strongly opposed the "U.S.-engineered deportation" of Serbian leader Slobodan Milošević to the International Criminal Tribunal for the former Yugoslavia for crimes against humanity committed in Yugoslavia. She accused the West of targeting Serbian civilians and stated the deportation to the Tribunal was "a crime against the people of Yugoslavia".

Cohn has contributed online commentary criticizing the former Bush administration to web sites such as MWC News, AlterNet, CounterPunch, CommonDreams, After Downing Street, ZNet and Truthdig. She also states that she has been a commentator for the BBC, CNN, MSNBC, Fox News, NPR and Pacifica Radio.

U.S. House of Representatives Judiciary Committee

In mid-2008, Cohn testified before the U.S. House of Representatives Judiciary Committee's Subcommittee on the Constitution, Civil Rights and Civil Liberties concerning enhanced interrogation techniques (i.e. torture) and their legal status.

Awards

Cohn has received the following awards:

 2005: Service to Legal Education Award by the San Diego County Bar Association.
 2007: Bernard E. Witkin, Esq. Award for Excellence in the Teaching of Law by the San Diego Law Library Justice Foundation.

Bibliography

Cohn has authored or co-authored books, including:

References

External links
Personal website

American legal scholars
American women legal scholars
American political writers
American commentators
Lawyers from San Diego
Thomas Jefferson School of Law people
American women lawyers
21st-century American women
Place of birth missing (living people)
Living people
1948 births